Tribalistas (Brazilian Portuguese: /tɾibaˈlistɐs, -ˈliʃtɐʃ/) is a Brazilian supergroup consisting of Arnaldo Antunes (ex-Titãs), Marisa Monte and Carlinhos Brown (Timbalada). Their debut collaboration resulted in the popular album Tribalistas, released in Brazil in late 2002 by EMI and in international territories in 2003. The album attained considerable popularity despite the group never performing any song on TV or giving any radio interviews.

A DVD release featuring the 'making of' and all the tracks on the album was also released internationally. The song "Já Sei Namorar" was featured in the video game FIFA Football 2004 and FIFA 23 and the song "Velha Infancia" was used as part of the soundtrack of the Brazilian soap opera Mulheres Apaixonadas.

In May 2013, it was announced that the three members would release a song called "Joga Arroz" (Throw Rice), in order to express their support of same-sex marriage, though it was not referred to as a revival of the band.

In April 2017, a column of newspaper O Globo'' announced that the trio had reunited in the previous month to compose new songs. In August of the same year, the band officially announced their reunion and released a new album.

Discography

Albums

Video albums

Singles

Promotional singles

References 

Musical groups established in 2002
Musical groups disestablished in 2003
Supergroups (music)
Música popular brasileira musical groups
Latin Grammy Award winners
2002 establishments in Brazil
2003 disestablishments in Brazil
Musical groups reestablished in 2017